Azay-sur-Cher (Azay on Cher) is a commune in the Indre-et-Loire department in central France.  It is twinned with Bedale, North Yorkshire, UK.

Population

See also
Communes of the Indre-et-Loire department

References

Communes of Indre-et-Loire